Theodore Waldemar Hukriede (November 9, 1878 – April 14, 1945) was a U.S. Representative from Missouri.

Born near New Truxton, Missouri, Hukriede attended the public schools, Central Wesleyan College, Warrenton, Missouri, and the University of Missouri, where he studied law.
Admitted to the bar in 1903, he commenced practice in Warrenton, Missouri, that same year.

Hukriede was elected prosecuting attorney of Warren County in 1904, 1906, and 1908; and served probate judge of Warren County from 1910-1920.

A Republican, he served as a delegate to the Missouri State conventions in 1900, 1908, 1912, 1916, 1936, and 1940; and as a delegate to the Republican National Conventions in 1916 and 1936. He also served as president of the Warrenton School Board from 1916 to 1920, and as chairman of the Republican State committee from 1916 to 1918.

Hukriede was elected as a Republican to the Sixty-seventh Congress (March 4, 1921 – March 3, 1923).
He was an unsuccessful candidate for reelection in 1922 to the Sixty-eighth Congress.
He was appointed United States Marshal for the eastern district of Missouri on May 12, 1923, and served until March 1933.
He resumed the practice of law afterward.

Hukriede was elected to the State house of representatives in 1942.
He was reelected in 1944 and served until his death in Warrenton, Missouri, on April 14, 1945.
He was interred in Warrenton Memorial Society Cemetery.

References

1878 births
1945 deaths
Central Wesleyan College (Missouri) alumni
University of Missouri alumni
United States Marshals
Missouri state court judges
Republican Party members of the Missouri House of Representatives
Republican Party members of the United States House of Representatives from Missouri
People from Warren County, Missouri
People from Warrenton, Missouri